Breaking Loose may refer to:

 Breaking Loose (album), an album by the Canadian rock band Helix
 Breaking Loose (film), a 1988 Australian film